The Mawé, also known as the Sateré or Sateré-Mawé, are an indigenous people of Brazil living in the state of Amazonas. They have an estimated population of about 13,350. The Sateré-Mawé were the first to domesticate and cultivate guaraná, a popular stimulant.

Name
The name "Sateré-Mawé" comes from Sateré, meaning "caterpillar of fire", and Mawé, meaning "intelligent and curious parrot".

They are also called Maué, Mawé, Mabue, Maragua, Sataré, Andira, Arapium.

Language
The Mawé speak the Sateré-Mawé language, which belongs to the Tupian family. A grammar book was developed for the language in 1986.

Initiation rites

The Sateré-Mawé people intentionally use bullet ant stings as part of their initiation rites to become a warrior. The ants are first rendered unconscious by submerging them in a natural sedative and then hundreds of them are woven into a glove made out of leaves (which resembles a large oven mitt), stinger facing inward. When the ants regain consciousness, the boy slips the glove onto his hand. The goal of this initiation rite is to keep the glove on for a full five minutes. When finished, the boy's hand and part of his arm are temporarily paralyzed due to the ant venom. In addition to suffering intense pain, he may hallucinate and shake uncontrollably for days. The only "protection" provided is a coating of charcoal on the hands, supposedly to confuse the ants and inhibit their stinging. To fully complete the initiation, however, the boys must go through the ordeal a total of 20 times over the course of several months.

References

Further reading
 Alvarez, Gabriel O. Pós-dradiviano: parentesco e ritual. : sistem de parentesco e rituais de afinabilidade os sateré-mawé. Série Antropologia (Brasília, Brazil), no.403. Brasília: Departamento de Antropologia, Universidade de Brasília, 2006.
 Gordon, Nick, Hildy Rubin, and Jessica Siegel. Gremlins Faces in the Forest. Nature video library. South Burlington, VT: WNET/Thirteen, 1998. (video - Satere Mawe customs involving marmosets)
Groes-Green, Christian. Courageous Caterpillars and Images of the Whiteman: Storytelling and Exchange as Indigenous Strategies in the Face of Discrimination in Manaus, Brazil. MA Thesis, Department of  Anthropology. Copenhagen: University of Copenhagen (Denmark), 2002. 
 Lattas, Andrew. "Anthropological Knowledge, Secrecy and Bolivip, Papua New Guinea: Exchanging Skin." Ethnos 74.3 (2009): 433-435. 
 Lorenz, Sônia da Silva. Sateré-Mawé: os filhos do guaraná. Coleção Projetos, 1. São Paulo, SP, Brasil: Centro de Trabalho Indigenista, 1992.
 Salzano F. M., T.A. Weimer, M.H.L.P. Franco, and M.H. Hutz. "Demography and Genetics of the Sateré-Mawé and their Bearing on the Differentiation of the Tupi Tribes of South America." Journal of Human Evolution 14.7 (1985): 647-655. 
 Vilaça, Aparecida, and Robin Wright. Native Christians: Modes and Effects of Christianity Among Indigenous Peoples of the Americas. Vitality of indigenous religions. Aldershot, Hants, England: Ashgate, 2008.
 Uggé, Henrique. Mitología sateré-maué. Quito, Ecuador: Ediciones ABYA-YALA, 1991.

External links
Sateré-Mawé artwork, National Museum of the American Indian

Indigenous peoples in Brazil
Indigenous peoples of the Amazon